Thomas Overtoom (born 20 November 1990) is a Dutch professional footballer who plays as a midfielder for Eerste Divisie club SC Telstar.

Career
Overtoom began his career 1998 in his hometown Amsterdam in the suburban De Meer for S.V. de Meer and joined 2004 to SV Diemen. On 18 February 2009 he announced his resign with the club SV Diemen and signed a contract for Jong Ajax. Overtoom played for the team between July 2009 and on loan from Ajax to franchise club HFC Haarlem in the Eerste Divisie. He earned with HFC Haarlem his first twelve professional caps in the Eerste Divisie and returned to AFC Ajax on 22 January 2010.

On 19 November 2020, he signed for SC Telstar as a free agent after having left NEC Nijmegen at the expiry of his contract in July 2020.

Career statistics

References

External links
 

1990 births
Living people
Footballers from Amsterdam
Association football midfielders
Dutch footballers
HFC Haarlem players
AFC Ajax players
Sparta Rotterdam players
SC Veendam players
FC Volendam players
Excelsior Rotterdam players
FC Emmen players
Almere City FC players
NEC Nijmegen players
SC Telstar players
Eredivisie players
Eerste Divisie players